The 2019 National Rugby Championship was the sixth season of the top flight of Australian domestic rugby union. The competition began on 31 August and concluded on 26 October. The match of the round was broadcast live each week on Fox Sports and Kayo Sports, with all matches streamed on rugby.com.au live. The championship featured eight professional teams, seven from Australia and one from Fiji.

Teams
The eight teams for the 2019 NRC season include two from New South Wales, two from Queensland, and one each from Australian Capital Territory, Victoria, Western Australia, and Fiji:

Television coverage and streaming 
One NRC match per round is broadcast live via Fox Sports. All matches are also shown live on the Kayo Sports and Rugby.com.au streaming platforms.

Experimental Law Variations
Two new trial variations were included for the 2019 NRC.
 A 50:22 kick, whereby a team kicking the ball indirectly into touch (i.e. not on the full) is awarded the resulting lineout throw if the ball is kicked: (a) from within the team's own half and finds touch in the opposition's 22; or (b) from within the team's own 22 and finds touch in the opposition's half.
 A goal line drop-out, awarded to the defending team if an attacking player brings the ball into the in-goal and is held up.

Regular season 
The eight teams competed in a round-robin tournament for the regular season. During this section of the competition, teams also played for the Horan-Little Shield, a challenge trophy put on the line when a challenge is accepted by the holders or mandated by the terms of the competition.

The regular season standings were determined via a slightly modified version of the standard competition points system— the same system as was used for The Rugby Championship and Super Rugby—with a bonus point awarded to a winning team scoring at least 3 more tries than their opponent; and a bonus point awarded to a losing team defeated by a margin of 7 points or under. Four points were awarded for a win and none for a loss; two points were awarded to each team for a draw.

Each team's placement was based on its cumulative points total, including any bonus points earned. For teams level on table points, tiebreakers apply in the following order:
 Difference between points for and against during the season.
 Head-to-head match result(s) between the tied teams.
 Total number tries scored during the season.

The top four teams at the end of the regular season qualified for the title play-offs in the form of semi-finals followed by a final to determine the champion team.

Standings

Team progression

Competition rounds

Round 1

Round 2

Round 3

Round 4

Round 5

Round 6

Round 7

Title playoffs

Semi-finals

Final

Season attendances

NRC Division 2 
The NRC II tournament was hosted by Rugby Union South Australia on 26–29 September in Adelaide as a competition for member unions and regions in Rugby Australia without a pathway to professional rugby via the main National Rugby Championship. The tournament was a reprisal of sorts of the Australian Rugby Shield which had been disbanded ten years earlier, and most of the representative teams which had featured in the Shield were invited to participate in NRC Division 2 in 2019. The eight teams scheduled to play in the tournament were:

Third place

Div 2 final

Notes
 Fox Sports broadcast match.

 The Northern Territory Mosquitoes team was a late withdrawal from the NRC II for 2019 and did not compete in the tournament.

References

External links
NRC  on Rugby.com.au
NRC on Fox Sports
NRC Live on twitter.com

Team webpages

2019 in Australian rugby union
2019 rugby union tournaments for clubs
2019 National Rugby Championship